Berth is a live CD/DVD by American rock band  the Used that was released on February 6, 2007. It has since been certified gold.

DVD information 
Along with the Vancouver concert from the 2005 Taste of Chaos tour, the DVD updates the band's history since 2003's Maybe Memories with footage about 2004's In Love and Death, the world tour, and the making of the new album Lies for the Liars as well as music videos. In addition, the band invited fans to submit questions and then videotaped those selected. It also gave a preview of "Pretty Handsome Awkward", the first music to be heard off of Lies for the Liars, and the recording of "My Pesticide" and "Tunnel".

Delay 
The Used were supposed to release a live album in early 2006, but one of the people in charge of filming mysteriously disappeared with much of the footage that was earmarked to be part of the DVD. The band was forced to come up with more footage, but in the long run Jeph Howard said it all turned out for the best. "I’m glad we waited. It's better than our first DVD", Howard said. "Everything has been going like that lately. It's been more than good."

CD listing

Personnel 

Visuals and imagery
 Alex Pardee – creative direction, design

Technical and production
 Nick Lambrou – director
 David May – production
 Raena Winscott – associate producer
 Sean Akhavan – project coordinator
 Seann Cowling – project coordinator
 Ashley Nichols – project coordinator
 Allan Hessler – post audio mixing, engineering
 Steve Evetts – post audio mixing, engineering
 Scott Levitin – masterering

Managerial
 Craig Aaronson – executive producer, A&R
 John Reese – executive producer
 John Oakes – executive producer
 Tim Carhart – A&R coordinator

Technical and production – Berth
 Nick Lambrou – director, editor, camera operator
 Brett Gardali – editor
 Mark Fiore – assistant editor
 Andrew Kopjak – assistant editor
 CW Mihlberger – assistant editor, camera operator
 Sai Siuanesan – camera operator
 Sim Kulgerman – camera operator
 Chris Marrs Piliero – camera operator
 Quinn Allman – camera operator
 Chris Wilson – camera operator
 Brian Berkowitz – camera operator
 Hilary Stewart – camera operator
 Jose – camera operator
 Milke Piliero – camera operator
 Rob Cammidge – camera operator
 Joshua Torrance – boom operator
 Brad Fotsch – audio subbing
 Allan Hessler – post audio mixing, engineer
 Steve Evetts – post audio mixing, engineer
 Scott Levitin – masterering
 Alex Pardee – menu graphics
 Sean Donnelly – menu graphics, DVD menus

Technical and production – Rock
 Nick Lambrou – director, editor
 John Oakes – producer
 Allan Hessler – post audio mixing, engineering
 Steve Evetts – post audio mixing, engineering
 Scott Levitin – masterering
 Jiri Bakala – associate producer
 Vern Giammartino – live producer
 Ed Hatton – live producer
 Shawn Talbot – director of photography
 Mark Fiore – camera operator
 Barry Kaiser – camera operator
 Scooter Corkle – camera operator
 Neal Vigar – camera operator
 Ryan Brown – camera operator
 Nathan Holley – camera operator
 Chris Anaka – camera operator
 Lee Johnson – camera assistant
 Dale Bredeson – camera assistant
 Blair Dykes – camera assistant
 John A. Woods – camera assistant
 Dan Rocque – camera assistant
 Miguel Gelinas – key grip
 Adrian R. Netto – dolly grip
 Shane Johnson – rigging grip
 Devan Thiessen – grip
 Brian Brook – crane operator
 Rob Graham – video technician
 Dana Atwood – production assistant
 Michael Baarda – production assistant

Technical and production – Junk
 Motion Theory – director of "Take It Away"
 Scott Ludden – producer of "Take It Away"
 Marc Webb – director of "All That I've Got"
 Hagai Shaham – producer of "All That I've Got"
 Kevin Kerslake – director of "I Caught Fire"
 Keeley Gould – producer of "I Caught Fire"
 CW Mihlberger – filming, editor of "Questions and Answers"

Charts and certifications

Charts

Certifications

Release history

References

External links

Berth at YouTube (streamed copy where licensed)

2007 live albums
2007 video albums
Live video albums
Reprise Records live albums
Reprise Records video albums
The Used albums